The Peninsular Gas Utilization (PGU) is the longest pipeline in Malaysia. The 1,700-kilometer-pipeline connecting Kerteh refinery in Terengganu to other areas of peninsula Malaysia. It is owned and operated by Petronas Gas Berhad on behalf of its holding company Petronas.

History
The PGU Project was constructed in 1984 and completed in 1993. The construction was divided into four phases including:
Phase 1: Tok Arun - Kerteh
Phase 2: 
 Section 1: Kerteh - Gebeng - Segamat
 Section 2: Segamat - Johor Bahru - Pasir Gudang
 Section 3: Segamat - Pedas - Serdang
Phase 3: Serdang-Gurun-Kangar
Phase 4 (Multi Product Pipeline): Serdang - Port Dickson - Malacca

Features
2,500 kilometers of pipeline.
Sensor system to control leaking gas.
Pipeline monitored centre at Pedas, Negeri Sembilan, Gebeng, Pahang and Segamat, Johor

External links
Gas Malaysia website
Peninsula Gas Utilisation (PGU) on Gas Malaysia website

Natural gas pipelines in Malaysia
1993 establishments in Malaysia
Buildings and structures completed in 1993